Aliabad-e Qeysariyyeh (also Romanized as Alīābād-e Qeyşarīyyeh; also known as ‘Alīābād) is a village in Qaleh Now Rural District, Qaleh Now District, Ray County, Tehran Province, Iran. At the 2006 census, its population was 110, in 23 families.

References 

Populated places in Ray County, Iran